Roots is a 2001 self-released album by American alternative country/roots rock group Blue Mountain.

Track listing
"Rye Whiskey" - 3:47
"Rain and Snow" - 3:44
"Black Is the Color of My True Love's Hair" - 5:03
"Banks of the Pontchartrain" - 5:00
"That Nasty Swing" (by Cliff Carlisle) - 3:20
"Spring of '65" - 4:13
"Riley and Spencer" - 3:20
"Young and Tender Ladies" - 3:36
"I'm Thinking Tonight of My Blue Eyes" (by A.P. Carter) - 2:30
"Little Stream of Whiskey" - 3:03
"Go Away Devil" (Bonus track) - 5:47
"Shady Grove" (Bonus track) - 5:55
"Country Blues" (by Dock Boggs) (Bonus track) - 5:21
"900 Miles" (Bonus track) - 3:04

All songs are traditional, except tracks #5, 9, 13 as indicated. All songs arranged by Blue Mountain.

Personnel
Cary Hudson - vocals, guitar, violin, harmonica
Laurie Stirratt - guitar, bass guitar, vocals
George Sheldon - bass guitar, vocals, piano
Frank Coutch - drums, percussion, lead vocals on "Little Stream of Whiskey"
Dave Boyer - mandolin on "Rye Whiskey"
Robert Chaffe (of Kudzu Kings) - keyboards on "Rain and Snow"

2001 albums
Blue Mountain (band) albums